Feodosia Gulf is a gulf in the Black Sea near Feodosia, Crimea.

References

Bodies of water of Crimea
Gulfs of the Black Sea
Gulfs of Russia
Bodies of water of Ukraine